"Rock My World (Little Country Girl)" is a song written by Bill LaBounty and Steve O'Brien and recorded by American country music duo Brooks & Dunn. It was released in December 1993 as the fourth single from their album Hard Workin' Man. It is also their second single to feature Kix Brooks on lead vocals instead of Ronnie Dunn. The song peaked at No. 2 on the Billboard Hot Country Singles & Tracks (now Hot Country Songs) chart.

Chart performance
The song debuted at No. 59 on the Hot Country Singles & Tracks chart dated December 18, 1993, and charted for 20 weeks on that chart. It peaked at No. 2 on the chart dated March 5, 1994, behind Mark Chesnutt's "I Just Wanted You to Know", as well as peaking at No. 97 on the Billboard Hot 100.

Charts

Year-end charts

References

1993 singles
1993 songs
Brooks & Dunn songs
Songs written by Bill LaBounty
Song recordings produced by Scott Hendricks
Song recordings produced by Don Cook
Arista Nashville singles